Abdulinsky District is an administrative district (raion), one of the thirty-five in Orenburg Oblast, Russia. It is located in the northwest of the oblast. Its administrative center is the town of Abdulino (which is not administratively a part of the district). As of the 2010 Census, the total population of the district was 10,373.

Administrative and municipal status
Within the framework of administrative divisions, Abdulinsky District is one of the thirty-five in the oblast. The town of Abdulino serves as its administrative center, despite being incorporated separately as an administrative unit with the status equal to that of the districts.

As a municipal division, the territory of the district and the territory of the Town of Abdulino are incorporated together as Abdulinsky Urban Okrug. Prior to July 10, 2015, the district was incorporated as Abdulinsky Municipal District, with the Town of Abdulino being incorporated within it as Abdulino Urban Settlement.

References

Notes

Sources



Districts of Orenburg Oblast